Vasilcău is a commune in Soroca District, Moldova. It is composed of three villages: Inundeni, Ruslanovca and Vasilcău.

References

Communes of Soroca District
Populated places on the Dniester